Petrochromis macrognathus is a species of cichlid endemic to Lake Tanganyika found in areas with rocky substrates where it can graze on algae. It can be found in the aquarium trade.

References

macrognathus
Fish described in 1983
Taxonomy articles created by Polbot